Biscoitos is a civil parish in the municipality of Praia da Vitória, on the island of Terceira in the Portuguese Azores. The population in 2011 was 1,424, in an area of 27.05 km². 

Due to its volcanic origin, its terrain is poor, so vines were and still are a very usual crop, so Biscoitos began to be known for its high quality wine, which is made with Verdelho grapes.

The village has a wine museum called the Museu do Vinho dos Biscoitos that was established in 1990.

References

External links
Biscoitos Blog

Freguesias of Praia da Vitória